Hawaii is the largest island in the United States, located in the state of Hawaii. It is the southeasternmost of the Hawaiian Islands, a chain of volcanic islands in the North Pacific Ocean. However, it has only 13% of Hawaiʻi's population. The island of Hawaiʻi is the third largest island in Polynesia, behind the two main islands of New Zealand.

The island is often referred to as the Island of Hawaii or Hawaii Island to distinguish it from the state. It is also referred to as the Big Island. Administratively, the island is coextensive with Hawaii County.

As of the 2020 census, the population was 200,629. The county seat and largest town is Hilo. There are no incorporated cities in Hawaiʻi County.

History 

Hawaii is said to have been named after Hawaiiloa, the legendary Polynesian navigator who first discovered it. Other accounts attribute the name to the legendary realm of Hawaiki, a place from which some Polynesian people are said to have originated, the place where they transition to in the afterlife, or the realm of the gods and goddesses. Captain James Cook, the English explorer and navigator who was captain of the first European expedition that came upon the Hawaiian Islands, called it O-Why-hee (from Hawaiian) and the "Sandwich Islands" after his patron, the Earl of Sandwich. Cook was killed on the Big Island at Kealakekua Bay on 14 February 1779, in a melee which followed the theft of a ship's boat.

Hawaii was the home island of Paiea Kamehameha, later known as Kamehameha the Great. Kamehameha united most of the Hawaiian islands under his rule in 1795, after several years of war, and gave the kingdom and the island chain the name of his native island.
In 1822, the missionary William Ellis arrived and was one of a party that completed a tour of the island, descriptions of which were later published in his journal.

Geology and geography 

The county's land area comprises 62.7 percent of the state's land area. It is the highest percentage by any county in the United States.

It has a land area of  comprising 62% of the Hawaiian Islands' land area. Measured from its sea floor base to its highest peak, Mauna Kea is the world's tallest mountain, taller than even Mount Everest, since the base of Mount Everest is above sea level.

Ka Lae, the southernmost point in the 50 states of the United States, is on Hawaii. The nearest landfall to the south is in the Line Islands. To the northwest of the island of Hawaii is the island of Maui, whose Haleakalā volcano is visible from Hawaii across the Alenuihaha Channel.

Volcanism 

The island of Hawaiʻi is built from five separate shield volcanoes that erupted somewhat sequentially, one overlapping the other. These are (from oldest to youngest):
 Kohala – extinct
 Mauna Kea – dormant
 Hualālai – active
 Mauna Loa – active, partly within Hawaii Volcanoes National Park
 Kīlauea – active, part of Hawaii Volcanoes National Park

Geological evidence from exposures of old surfaces on the south and west flanks of Mauna Loa led to the proposal that two ancient volcanic shields (named Ninole and Kulani) were all but buried by the younger Mauna Loa. Geologists now consider these "outcrops" to be part of the earlier building of Mauna Loa.

Because Mauna Loa and Kīlauea are active volcanoes, the island of Hawaii is still growing. Between January 1983 and September 2002, lava flows added  to the island. Lava flowing from Kīlauea has destroyed several towns, including Kapoho in 1960 and again in 2018, and Kalapana and Kaimū in 1990. In 1987 lava filled in "Queen's Bath", a large, L-shaped, freshwater pool in the Kalapana area. Another 875 acres were added between May to July, 2018 by the 2018 lower Puna eruption. Mauna Loa erupted in 2022 after 38 years.

Some geologists count seven volcanoes as building the island, which include the submarine volcanoes Māhukona and Kamaʻehuakanaloa (formerly Lōʻihi) as parts of the base of the island. Māhukona off the northwest corner of the island has already disappeared below the surface of the ocean. Continued activity at current rates from Kamaʻehuakanaloa will likely cause it to break the surface of the ocean sometime between 10,000 and 100,000 years from now.

Great Crack 

According to the United States Geological Survey (USGS), the Great Crack is the result of crustal dilation from magmatic intrusions into the southwest rift zone of Kilauea. While neither the earthquake of 1868 nor that of 1975 caused a measurable change in the Great Crack, lava welled out of the lower  of the Great Crack in 1823.

Visitors can find trails, rock walls, and archaeological sites from as old as the 12th century around the Great Crack.

Hilina Slump 

The Hilina Slump is a  section of the south slope of the Kīlauea volcano which is slipping away from the island. Undersea measurements show that a "bench" has formed a buttress and that this buttress may tend to reduce the likelihood of future catastrophic detachment.

Earthquakes and tsunamis 

On 2 April 1868, an earthquake with a magnitude estimated between 7.25 and 7.9 rocked the southeast coast of Hawaii. This was the most destructive earthquake in the recorded history of Hawaii. A tsunami claimed 46 more lives. The villages of Punaluu, Nīnole, Kawaa, Honuapo, and Keauhou Landing were severely damaged.

On 29 November 1975, a  section of the Hilina Slump dropped  and slid  toward the ocean. This movement caused a 7.2 magnitude earthquake and a  tsunami. Oceanfront property was washed off its foundations in Punaluu. Two deaths were reported at Halape, and 19 other people were injured.

The island suffered tsunami damage from earthquakes in Alaska on 1 April 1946, and in Chile on 23 May 1960. Downtown Hilo was severely damaged by both tsunamis, with many lives lost. Just north of Hilo, Laupāhoehoe lost 16 schoolchildren and five teachers in the tsunami of 1946.

In March 2011, a 9.0 magnitude earthquake off the east coast of Japan again created a tsunami that caused minor damage in Hawaii. The estimated damage to public buildings alone was about US$3 million. In the Kona area this tsunami washed a house into Kealakekua Bay, destroyed a yacht club and tour boat offices in Keauhou Bay, caused extensive damage in Kailua Kona, flooded the ground floor of the King Kamehameha Hotel, and permanently closed the Kona Village Resort.

In early May 2018, hundreds of small earthquakes were detected on Kīlauea's East rift zone, leading officials to issue evacuation warnings. On 3 May 2018, the volcano erupted in Puna after a 5.0 earthquake earlier in the day, causing evacuations of the Leilani Estates and Lanipuna Gardens subdivisions. A seemingly related 5.3 magnitude quake and a subsequent 6.9 magnitude earthquake occurred on 4 May.

Volcanic fog 

Vog (volcanic fog) can envelop the island of Hawaii when Kilauea Volcano is active. Since the termination of volcanic activity in September 2018, the vog has largely disappeared on the west side of the island. The gas plumes of the Kīlauea Volcano create a blanket of vog which the dominant trade winds mostly deflect toward the Kona coast on the west side of the island of Hawaiʻi. Vog contains chemicals that can damage the environment and the health of plants, humans, and other animals. Most of the aerosols are acidic and of a size where they can remain in the lungs to damage them and impair function. Flu-like symptoms and general lethargy are reported, and are especially pronounced in people with respiratory conditions.

National protected areas 

 Ala Kahakai National Historic Trail
 Hakalau Forest National Wildlife Refuge
 Hawaiʻi Volcanoes National Park
 Kaloko-Honokōhau National Historical Park
 Kohala Historical Sites State Monument (Mookini Heiau)
 Kona Forest National Wildlife Refuge
 Puʻuhonua o Hōnaunau National Historical Park
 Puʻukoholā Heiau National Historic Site

Economy 

Sugarcane was the backbone of the island of Hawaii's economy for more than a century. In the mid-20th century, sugarcane plantations began to downsize, and in 1995 the last plantation closed.

Most of the island's economy is based on tourism, centered primarily in resort areas on the western coast of the island in the North Kona and South Kohala districts. More recently, Hawaii Island has become a focus for sustainable tourism.

Diversified agriculture is a growing sector of the economy. Major crops include macadamia nuts, papaya, flowers, tropical and temperate vegetables, and coffee beans. Only coffee grown in the Kona District of this island may be branded Kona coffee. The island's orchid agriculture is the largest in the state, and resulted in the unofficial nickname "The Orchid Isle". The island is also known for astronomy, with numerous telescopes operated on the summit of Mauna Kea at the Mauna Kea Observatories, where atmospheric clarity is excellent and there is little light pollution.

NELHA (Natural Energy Laboratory of Hawaii Authority), a  state developed site, is a green economic development ocean science and technology park on the west side of the island. It provides resources and facilities for energy and ocean-related research, education, and commercial activities in an environmentally sound and culturally sensitive manner. Business tenants on this coastal site include microalgae farms, aquaculture, solar technology and marine biotech. A 2012 study by the University of Hawaii Economic Research Organization (UHERO) found the total economic impact of activities at NELHA was $87.7 million and created 583 jobs.

Transportation

Roads 
Three routes connect the two major towns, Hilo on the east coast and Kailua-Kona on the west coast of the island:
 State highways 19 & 190, the northern route via Waimea
 State highway 11, the southern route via Hawaii Volcanoes National Park
 Saddle Road (aka the Daniel K. Inouye Memorial highway), passing between Mauna Loa and Mauna Kea).

There are also State highways 270 (Kawaihae – Hawi) and 180 (the "Kona coffee road", from Honalo to State highway 190), South Point Road (Highway 11 to South Point), etc.

There are presently three Hawaii Scenic Byways on the island of Hawaii:
 Mamalahoa Kona Heritage Center
 Royal Footsteps Along the Kona Coast
 Kau Scenic Byway – The Slopes of Mauna Loa

Rental car offices are at the international airports. Taxi service is also available. Island-wide bus service is provided by the "Hele-On Bus".

Airports 
Two commercial airports serve Hawaiʻi Island:
 Hilo International Airport (ITO)
 Kona International Airport (KOA)

There is also:
 Waimea-Kohala Airport (MUE)
 Upolu Airport (UPP)

Seaports 
Major commercial ports are Hilo on the east side and Kawaihae on the west side of the island. Cruise ships often stop at Kailua-Kona (90 times in 2017) and Hilo (108 times in 2017).

Tourism

Places of interest 

 Akaka Falls, one of the tallest waterfalls on the island.
 Amy B. H. Greenwell Ethnobotanical Garden houses many endangered endemic plants.
 East Hawaii Cultural Center
 Hawaii Tropical Botanical Garden
 Hawaii Volcanoes National Park, comprising the active volcanoes Kīlauea and Mauna Loa
 Hulihee Palace, a royal palace in Kailua-Kona
 ʻImiloa Astronomy Center in Hilo
 Ka Lae, the southernmost point in the United States
 Laupāhoehoe Train Museum
 Lyman House Memorial Museum in Hilo
 Manuka State Wayside Park
 Mauna Kea Observatories
 Nani Mau Gardens
 Onizuka Center for International Astronomy
 Pacific Tsunami Museum overlooking Hilo Bay
 Pana'ewa Rainforest Zoo in Hilo
 Pua Mau Place Arboretum and Botanical Garden
 Puuhonua o Hōnaunau National Historical Park
 Puukoho'ā Heiau National Historic Site, the site of one of the most significant heiau in Hawaii
 Rainbow Falls State Park
 Sadie Seymour Botanical Gardens
 Umauma Falls
 University of Hawaii at Hilo Botanical Gardens
 Waipio Valley
 Wao Kele o Puna
 World Botanical Gardens

Hotels on the east coast
The larger hotels on the east coast are:
Grand Naniloa Hotel, Hilo
Hilo Hawaiian Hotel
Volcano House, Kīlauea

Hotels on the west coast
The larger hotels on the west coast, from north (Puako) to south (Captain Cook):
Mauna Kea Beach Hotel
The Fairmont Orchid
Hilton Waikoloa Village
Waikoloa Beach Marriott
Four Seasons Resort Hualalai
Royal Kona Resort
Sheraton Kona Resort & Spa at Keauhou Bay
Manago Hotel
Mauna Lani Resort by Auberge

Maps 

Interactive 3D model for Chrome or Firefox

See also 
 National Register of Historic Places listings on the island of Hawaii

References

External links 

 Official Hawaii County website
 Hawai'i Volcanoes National Park official website
 Hawaii (island) at Encyclopædia Britannica
 Hawaii Tribune-Herald – official website of the Hawaii Tribune-Herald, a daily newspaper in Hilo
 West Hawaii Today – official website of West Hawaii Today
 Island of Hawaii from the International Space Station – NASA satellite image, taken from the International Space Station on 28 February 2015
 
 

 

Islands of Hawaii
Endemic Bird Areas